The Oldsmobile Calais is a compact car that was manufactured and marketed by Oldsmobile from 1985 through 1991, superseding the Oldsmobile Omega and named after the city of Calais, France. Renamed the Cutlass Calais for 1988, and briefly available in 1987 as the limited edition GMO Quad 4, the Calais shared the GM N platform with the Pontiac Grand Am and the Buick Skylark/Buick Somerset — and was superseded by the Oldsmobile Achieva in 1992. 

The first production model (VIN 1G3NT27UXFM200001), was a white Calais Supreme two-door with a gray velour interior. Equipped with an automatic transmission and the 92 horsepower, 151 CID pushrod four-cylinder engine (also known as GM's "Iron Duke" Tech-IV), this particular model was outfitted with nearly every available option, including wire wheel covers. While this front-wheel drive car is maintained by the R.E. Olds Transportation Museum in Lansing, Michigan, it was one of more than 700 vehicles that made up the GM Heritage Collection of historically significant vehicles that date back to the early 1900s. The Calais Supreme was auctioned in April, 2021, and sold for $8,585.

In 1987, the Quad 4 engine was developed and became available in a special limited edition of the Calais called the "GMO Quad 4". Early television ads touting the new engine's abilities showed video of the Calais GMO Quad 4 racing around city streets (the submodel was dropped, however the Quad 4 engine continued to be available for several years afterward). Another, later special Cutlass Calais model was the 1990 to 1991 Quad-442. It used a high-output version of the four-cylinder coupled to a 5-speed manual transmission. This same High Output version was also available in the top-of-the-line Cutlass Calais International Series.

 
The International Series was available as both a 2-door or a 4-door and featured exclusive options for the Calais range including lower front and rear facias, lower rocker extensions, and quad-tipped sport exhaust. Changes inside include thickly bolstered sport seats which feature driver-side power controls and were available in cloth with leather accents or full leather. The International Series came standard with power locks and windows with driver's side auto-down, a multifunction Driver Information Center in the center console, full gauges, cruise control, and the uplevel FE3 sport suspension. The standard engine for the International was the new-for-1990 Quad 4 H.O. although the normal Quad 4 L.O. and automatic transmission were an option. Optional equipment on the International series included keyless entry and a Delco CD player.

Previously, the Cutlass Calais nameplate was used on top-line versions of the Cutlass Supreme coupé (differing from the Supreme only in minor trim details) from 1978 to 1984. There was also a Cadillac Calais model, sold from 1965 to 1976.

Engines
 1985–1988 Tech IV 2.5 L (151 in³) I4, 92-98 hp and 
 1989–1991 Tech IV 2.5 L (151 in³) I4,  and 
 1987–1991 Quad 4 2.3 L (140 in³) I4, 150-160 hp and 
 1991–1992 Quad OHC 2.3 L (140 in³) I4,  and  
 1985–1988 Buick 3.0 L (181 in³) V6,  and 150 lb-ft (203 N-m)
 1989–1991 3300 3.3 L (204 in³) V6,  and

References

 Flammang, James M./Kowalke, Ron: Standard Catalog of American Cars 1976–1999, Krause Publications, Iola 1999. 

Compact cars
Coupés
Front-wheel-drive vehicles
Cutlass Calais
Sedans
Vehicles built in Lansing, Michigan
Cars introduced in 1985
1990s cars
Cars discontinued in 1991